Doris may refer to:

People

Given name 
Doris (mythology) of Greek mythology, daughter of Oceanus and Tethys
 Doris, fictional character in the Canadian television series Caillou and the mother of the titular character
Doris (singer) (born 1947), Swedish rock and pop singer
 Doris, mother of Antipater (son of Herod I)
Doris Achelwilm, German journalist and politician 
Doris Akers (1923–1995), American gospel music singer and composer
Doris Akol (born 1970), Ugandan lawyer and administrator
Doris Allen (disambiguation), multiple people
Doris Anderson (1921–2007), Canadian author, journalist, and women's rights activist
Doris Anderson (screenwriter) (1897–1971), American screenwriter
Doris Margaret Anderson (1922–2022), Canadian nutritionist and politician
Doris Angleton (1951–1997), American socialite and murder victim
Doris Bartholomew (born 1930), American linguist
Doris Beck (1929–2020), American politician
Doris Belack (1926–2011), American actress
Doris Benegas (1951–2016), Spanish lawyer and politician
Doris Bensimon (1924–2009), Austrian-born French sociologist and academic
Doris Betts (1932–2012), American author
Doris Bigornia (born 1966), Filipina journalist
Doris Blackburn (1889–1970), Australian social reformer and politician
Doris Buffett (1928–2020), American heiress and philanthropist
Doris Burke (born 1965), American basketball player and broadcaster
Doris Burn (1923–2011), American children's author and illustrator
Doris Calloway (1923–2001), American nutritionist
Doris Day (1922–2019), stage name of Doris Kappelhoff, American singer, actress, and animal welfare advocate
Doris Dana (1920–2006), American writer and translator
Doris Dartey (died 2020), Ghanaian educator and journalist
Doris Deane (1901–1974), American actress
Doris Dragović (born 1961), Yugoslav-Croatian pop singer
Doris Duke (1912–1993), American heiress, socialite, horticulturalist, and philanthropist
Doris Duke (soul singer) (1941–2019), American gospel and soul singer
Doris Gentile (1894–1972), Australian novelist and short story writer
Doris Gregory, Canadian author
C. Doris Hellman (1910–1973), American historian of science
Doris Jensen (disambiguation)
Doris Kearns Goodwin (born 1943), American journalist, biographer and historian
Doris Kohardt (born 1950), German Olympic swimmer
Doris Laine (1931–2018), Finnish ballet dancer
Doris Lessing (1919–2013), British-Zimbabwean novelist
Doris Leuthard (born 1963), Swiss politician and lawyer
Doris Matsui (born 1944), American politician
Doris Miller (1919–1943), U.S. Navy sailor
Doris Pinčić (born 1988), Croatian actress
Doris de Pont (born 1954), New Zealand fashion designer
Doris Roberts (1925–2016), American actress 
Doris Salcedo (born 1958), Colombian sculptor
Doris Buchanan Smith (1934–2002), American children's author
Doris Stockton (1924–2018), American mathematician
Doris the Ugly Stepsister, fictional character from the Shrek film series

Surname 
Caelan Doris (born 1998), Irish rugby player 
Ennio Doris (1940–2021), Italian billionaire
Mirna Doris (1940–2020), Italian singer

Animals 
 Doris (gastropod), a genus of marine gastropod molluscs in the family Dorididae
 Grammia doris, the Doris tiger moth, a moth of the family Erebidae
 Heliconius doris, the Doris butterfly of Central and South America
 Orange-peel doris, a nudibranch (slug)

Places 
 Doris (Asia Minor), a region of Asia Minor inhabited by Dorians
 Doris (Greece), a region in central Greece in which the Dorians had their traditional homeland
 Doris, Iowa, United States
 48 Doris, an asteroid discovered in 1857, traditionally classified as a minor planet

Ships and seafaring 
 Doris (sailing yacht), an America's Cup type racing yacht built in 1905
 French submarine Doris, three submarines of the French navy
 , various ships of the British Royal Navy
 , a United States Navy patrol boat in commission from 1917 to 1918
 , a United States Navy patrol boat in commission from 1917 to 1919
 USS Doris Miller (CVN-81) a future Gerald R. Ford-class aircraft carrier of the United States Navy.
 In French, a dory is un doris (plural in English: dories).

Music
 Doris (album), a 2013 studio album by Earl Sweatshirt*
 Doris (opera), an 1889 opera by Alfred Cellier

Other uses 
 DORIS (geodesy), a French system used for satellite orbit positioning
 Doris, or DOR-15, a robotic bowler hat and main antagonist of Meet the Robinsons
 Doris the waitress, a character in the 1993 American fantasy comedy Groundhog Day
 Hello, My Name Is Doris, a 2015 American film
 Storm Doris, a windstorm in northwestern Europe in February 2017

See also
 
 Dorries
 Dorit (disambiguation), the Modern Hebrew form of "Doris"